Justice League: Chronicles is a 2003 video game developed by Full Fat and published by Midway Games for the Game Boy Advance. This game has 3 levels and each has two characters. On the first stage is Green Lantern and Flash, on the second is Batman and Hawkgirl and the last are Superman and Wonder Woman. The game received unfavorable reviews from critics.

Development and release
On May 9, 2003, Midway Games announced at E3 that it would release a sequel to its 2002 title Justice League: Injustice for All, titled Justice League: Dark Reflections, and displayed the game at the company's booth the following week. It was shipped to North American retailers under its final title on November 10, 2003.

Reception

Justice League: Chronicles received "generally unfavorable" reviews according to review aggregator Metacritic.

References

External links
 

2003 video games
Full Fat games
Game Boy Advance games
Game Boy Advance-only games
Chronicles
North America-exclusive video games
Superhero video games
Video games based on adaptations
Chronicles
Video games based on the DC Animated Universe
Video games developed in the United Kingdom
Video games set in Africa
Video games set in Antarctica